The Algonquins of Pikwàkanagàn First Nation, formerly known as the Golden Lake First Nation,  are an Algonquin First Nation in Ontario, Canada.  Their territory is located in the former township of South Algona (now part of Bonnechere Valley) in the Ottawa Valley on Golden Lake.

As of October, 2008, the registered population of the First Nation was 1,992 people, of which only 406 people lived on their own reserve.

Reserve
The First Nation have reserved for themselves the Pikwakanagan Indian Reserve, formerly known as Golden Lake 39 Indian Reserve. The land straddles the south shores of Golden Lake and the Bonnechere River.

References

External links
Algonquins of Pikwàkanagàn First Nation website
Profile of the First Nation from the Department of Indian Affairs and Northern Affairs
Omàmiwininì Pimàdjwowin: The Algonquin Way Cultural Centre

First Nations governments in Ontario
First Nations in Renfrew County
Algonquin